Stéphen Drouin (born 27 January 1984) is a former French professional football defender.

External links

1984 births
Living people
French footballers
Ligue 1 players
CA Paris-Charenton players
Vannes OC players
Ligue 2 players
Association football defenders
FC Nantes players
ES Troyes AC players
France youth international footballers